Bagliettoa is a genus of lichen-forming fungi in the family Verrucariaceae. The genus was circumscribed by Italian lichenologist Abramo Bartolommeo Massalongo in 1853. Bagliettoa species are endolithic, growing between the grains of solid rock.

Species
Bagliettoa bagliettoiformis 
Bagliettoa baldensis 
Bagliettoa calciseda 
Bagliettoa cazzae 
Bagliettoa ceracea 
Bagliettoa crassa 
Bagliettoa crassiuscula 
Bagliettoa inaequata 
Bagliettoa limborioides 
Bagliettoa marmorea 
Bagliettoa ocellata 
Bagliettoa operculata 
Bagliettoa parmigera 
Bagliettoa parmigerella 
Bagliettoa quarnerica 
Bagliettoa rubrocincta 
Bagliettoa sphinctrina 
Bagliettoa sphinctrinella 
Bagliettoa steineri 
Bagliettoa subconcentrica 
Bagliettoa suzaeana

References

Verrucariales
Eurotiomycetes genera
Lichen genera
Taxa described in 1853
Taxa named by Abramo Bartolommeo Massalongo